Lieutenant General Ghulam Mustafa is a retired three-star general of the Pakistan Army. He is credited with raising the Army Strategic Forces Command. He was born in an Arain Family.

References

Year of birth missing (living people)
Living people
Pakistan Army officers